Materials & Design is a peer-reviewed open access scientific journal published by Elsevier. It covers research on the practical applications of engineering materials including materials processing. Article formats are regular, express, and review articles (typically commissioned by the editors). 

The editor-in-chief is Alexander M. Korsunsky (Trinity College, Oxford).

The journal was established in 1978 as the International Journal of Materials in Engineering Applications and obtained its current title in 1980.

Abstracting and indexing
The journal is abstracted and indexed by:
 Current Contents/Engineering, Computing & Technology
 Inspec
 Materials Science Citation Index
 Metals Abstracts
 Physics Abstracts
 Scopus
According to the Journal Citation Reports, the journal has a 2021 impact factor of 9.417.

References

External links

Materials science journals
Elsevier academic journals
Publications established in 1978
English-language journals